Navakh (also Romanized as Nāvakh and Nāvokh; also known as Nāvaj) is a village in Bizaki Rural District, Golbajar District, Chenaran County, Razavi Khorasan Province, Iran. At the 2006 census, its population was 70, in 13 families.

References 

Populated places in Chenaran County